QSI International School of Dili is a school located in Fatuhada, beside the Palm Spring estate in Dili, East Timor. It is one of a chain of schools operated by Quality Schools International The school has 79 students representing 21 countries. The school has American-curriculum based classes ranging from preschool to secondary levels. It offers students the opportunity to learn and do extracurricular activities. It was accredited by the Middle States Association of Colleges and Schools.

Academics
The teachers include  12 full-time, 3 paraprofessionals, and other staff (i.e. maintenance, cleaning, special subjects).
Courses at QSID include English/Literature, Mathematics, Cultural Studies, Science, French, Portuguese, Tetum, Creative and Applied Arts, Personal Health and World Environment Issues.

Facility
The school is located behind the Australian Embassy in a small compound (7 classrooms & 2 residences). There is a large playground, football field, basketball court, art room, music room, covered lunch areas, and a computer lab.

References

External links

school website

Dili
Schools in Dili
American international schools in East Timor
Educational institutions established in 2005
2005 establishments in East Timor